Air Miami was an American indie rock band from Washington, D.C. that was active from 1994 to 1996. The band was formed by Mark Robinson and Bridget Cross, both former members of Unrest, a few months later they became a quartet with the addition of drummer Mike Fellow and bassist Lauren Feldsher.
They had releases on the 4AD Records and TeenBeat Records labels.

The 7" single "Airplane Rider" received quite a bit of attention from college radio, as did the song "World Cup Fever".

Discography
Fourteen Songs cassette (self-released, 1994)
Airplane Rider 7"45 (Teenbeat, 1994)
Sixteen Songs cassette (self-released, 1994)
Me. Me. Me. LP (4AD/Teenbeat, 1995)
Fuck You, Tiger EP (4AD/Teenbeat, 1995)
World Cup Fever Remixes EP (Teenbeat, 1998)

References

External links
Air Miami at Myspace
Air Miami at Teen-Beat

1996 disestablishments in Washington, D.C.
1994 establishments in Washington, D.C.
Indie rock musical groups from Washington, D.C.
Musical groups disestablished in 1996
Musical groups established in 1994
Musical quartets
Musical groups from Washington, D.C.
4AD artists
TeenBeat Records artists